The Associação Bauru Basketball Team, commonly known as Bauru Basquete (Bauru Basket), is a Brazilian professional basketball team that is based in Bauru, São Paulo, Brazil. The club plays Brazil's top-tier level league, the Novo Basquete Brasil (NBB).

Founded in 1994, Bauru has won two NBB championships, in 2002 and 2016. They also won the continental championship once when they won the FIBA Americas League in 2015. Bauru was the runner-up in the 2015 FIBA Intercontinental Cup.

The team plays its home games in the Ginásio Panela de Pressão, which has capacity for 2,000 people. Bauru is known for being the second club of Leandrinho Barbosa.

Crests and colors

History
Bauru was the second team of the Brazilian shooting guard Leandrinho Barbosa. Barbosa was an important player during the previous top-tier level Nacional Championship, in 2002. In that year, Bauru won the championship title, after winning a series against Araraquara. Barbosa and his teammates Marquinhos Vieira, Murilo Becker, Vanderlei, and others, won the series by a 3–0 score.

In the new Brazilian top-tier league, the NBB's first season (2008–09), Bauru signed the American Brazilian point guard Larry Taylor. In the NBB's fourth season (2011–12), Taylor, helped by the young player Gui Deodato, the experienced Fernando Fischer, and another American, Jeff Agba, led the team to a sixth place finish in the league.

Bauru won its first FIBA Americas League championship, as they won the 2015 FIBA Americas League. The club was thus crowned the Latin American champions for the first time. Because of the Americas League victory, the team would then play in the 2015 FIBA Intercontinental Cup, against the EuroLeague's 2014–15 season champions, Real Madrid.

Bauru Basket has also won three São Paulo State Championships. Bauru reached even bigger heights, when it was announced that the team would be a part of the 2015–16 NBA preseason's international versus NBA games. Bauru played against the NBA clubs, the New York Knicks and the Washington Wizards in the United States, becoming the third Brazilian team to play against NBA teams, after C.R. Vasco da Gama and C.R. Flamengo.

In the 2016–17 NBB season, after two consecutive losses in the NBB's finals, Bauru finally became the Brazilian League champions once again, by winning the title for the first time in 15 years. They won the title, after coming back from a 2-0 series deficit, to beat C.A. Paulistano, in a 5 games series. Bauru's Alex Garcia, was named the NBB Finals MVP.

Honors and titles

Worldwide
FIBA Intercontinental Cup
Runners-up (1): 2015

Latin America
FIBA Americas League
Champions (1): 2015
Runners-up (1): 2016

Continental
South American League
Champions (2): 2014, 2022

South American Club Championship
Runners-up (1): 1999

National
 Brazilian Championship
Champions (2): 2002, 2016–17
Runners-up (2): 2014–15, 2015–16

Regional
 São Paulo State Championship
Champions (3): 1999, 2013, 2014
Runners-up (2): 2000, 2016

Other tournaments
 Troféu Cláudio Mortari 
Winners (2): 2015, 2016
 Torneio Interligas: 2019
 Copa TV TEM: 2008
 Copa EPTV: 2010

Matches against NBA teams

Players

Current roster (season 2019-20)

Notable players

 Leandrinho Barbosa 
 Murilo Becker 
 Valtinho da Silva 
 Maury de Souza
 Josuel dos Santos
 Alex Garcia  
 Rafael Hettsheimeir 
 Larry Taylor 
 Marquinhos Vieira

Head coaches
 Jorge "Guerrinha" Guerra
 Demétrius Conrado Ferraciú

References

External links
Official website 
Latinbasket.com team Profile

Basketball teams in Brazil
Basketball teams established in 1994
Basketball in São Paulo (state)
Bauru
Novo Basquete Brasil